The Gallery of Beauties is a collection of 36 portraits of the most beautiful women from the nobility and middle classes of Munich, Germany, painted between 1827 and 1850 (mostly by Joseph Karl Stieler, appointed court painter in 1820) and gathered by Ludwig I of Bavaria in the south pavilion of his Nymphenburg Palace in Munich. Two additional ones were created by Friedrich Dürck. Its best-known works are the portraits of the shoemaker's daughter Helene Sedlmayr, the actress Charlotte von Hagn (revered by audiences in Munich, Berlin and Saint Petersburg) and the king's Irish mistresses Eliza Gilbert (Lola Montez) and Marianna Marquesa Florenzi. They include a Briton, a Greek, a Scot and an Israelite, along with relations of Ludwig's - the wife and daughter of Ludwig of Oettingen-Wallerstein were both painted, as was Ludwig I's daughter Princess Alexandra of Bavaria.

The collection was a late example of a fashion for such series, which includes an earlier one in Munich of beauties of the French court brought back from Versailles by Maximilian II. Emanuel who had spent a period there. In England there are the Windsor Beauties, eleven of the King's mistresses painted by Sir Peter Lely in the 1660s, and the Hampton Court Beauties, a later set by Sir Godfrey Kneller.

List
A list of the portraits follows:

References

External links

Beauties
Portraits by German artists
Sets of portraits
German paintings